George Coventry may refer to:
George Coventry, 3rd Baron Coventry (1628–1680), English nobleman
George Coventry, 6th Earl of Coventry (1722–1809), British peer and Tory politician
George Coventry, 7th Earl of Coventry (1758–1831), British peer and member of parliament
George Coventry, 8th Earl of Coventry (1784–1843), British peer and Tory politician
George Coventry, 9th Earl of Coventry (1838–1930), British politician
George Coventry, 10th Earl of Coventry (1900–1940), Earl of Coventry
George William Coventry, 11th Earl of Coventry (1934–2002), British peer and politician
George Coventry, 13th Earl of Coventry (born 1939), English peer
Rev George Coventry FRSE (1791–1872) Scottish minister and amateur scientist